Xavier Montanyà Atoche (born 1961) is a Spanish journalist who has written a number of investigatory books and has directed several documentaries.

Career and work

Xavier Montanyà was born in Barcelona in 1961, and became a journalist and the author of documentaries.
He was on the advisory board of La Vanguardia's "Cultura/s" (2002-2013), and is a collaborator of VilaWeb and Sàpiens.

His feature film Memoria negra (Black memory) was selected at the Festival of Valladolid (2006).
The film, exhibited at the African Film Festival of Cordoba and other festivals, explores the problems caused by the Spanish colonization of Equatorial Guinea.
His 2009 Les Espions de Franco (Franco's Spies) documents the activity of Franco's spies behind the lines in the Spanish Civil War. It shows that the French police were aware of the network yet did little to stop it.
In his 2011 book L'or negre de la mort (The black gold of the dead) he explores the situation in the Niger Delta where multinationals are extracting (and spilling) crude oil.
He discusses the corruption of the government, ecological impact, poverty and violence that affects the inhabitants.

Bibliography

  
 
 

.Nominated for the Rodolfo Walsh Price in the Semana Negra de Gijón (2012).
Xavier Montanyà, (2012). L'Or noire du Nigeria. Pillages, ravages écologiques et résistances. Agone Editions & Survie, Dossiers Noirs (25).
Xavier Montanyà, (2015). El cas Vinader. El periodisme contra la guerra bruta. Pòrtic, 2015
Xavier Montanyà, (2016). Pirates de la liberté. Éditions L'Échappée, 2016. 
Xavier Montanyà, (2016). Kid Tunero, el caballero del ring. Pepitas de calabaza ed.

Filmography

References

Living people
1961 births
People from Barcelona
Film directors from Catalonia
Journalists from Catalonia